Secretary to the Governor General is the title used by the administrative head of the Office of the Secretary to the Governor General (OSGG), the Canadian government office that supports the work of the Governor General of Canada. The position is based at Rideau Hall in Ottawa, Ontario.

On January 29, 2021, Ian McCowan was named to the position, effective February 1, 2021. The previous office-holder was Assunta Di Lorenzo, who was appointed in January 2018 and resigned in January 2021.

Overview
The position is one of the oldest public service appointments in Canada and holds the courtesy rank of deputy minister within the Public Service of Canada. Since Confederation, every office-holder has been appointed by order-in-council. The first post-Confederation incumbent, Dennis Godley, initially assumed his post in 1861 and continued into the post-Confederation period, departing in November 1868.

The Secretary to the Governor General holds a number of ex officio positions, as follows. Since the establishment of the Order of Canada in 1967, the office-holder has served as Secretary General of the Order of Canada. The office-holder also serves as Secretary General of the Order of Military Merit and the Order of Merit of the Police Forces. Following the creation of the Canadian Heraldic Authority in 1988, the office-holder became Herald Chancellor of Canada.

Secretaries to the Governor General

Pre-Confederation
 1841-1842: Thomas William Clinton Murdoch
 1842-1844: Rawson W. Rawson
 1842-1843: Henry Bagot (private secretary)
 1843-1846: James Macaulay Higginson (private secretary)
 1847-1849: Thomas Edmund Campbell
 1851-1854: Robert Bruce
 1854-1854: Laurence Oliphant
 1854-1856: William Keppel, Viscount Bury
 1856-1861: Richard T. Pennefather
 1861-1861: Francis Retallack (acting secretary)
 1861-1867: Dennis Godley

Post-Confederation
 1867-1868: Dennis Godley
 1868-1872: Francis Turville
 1872-1875: Lt.-Col. Henry Charles Fletcher
 1875 (March-October): Harry Moody
 1875-1878: Edward George Percy Littleton
 1878-1883: Francis W. de Winton
 1883-1885: Viscount Melgund (later 4th Earl of Minto)
 1885-1888: Henry Streatfeild
 1888 (June-July): Josceline FitzRoy Bagot
 1888-1892: C. R. W. Colville
 1892-1893: J. T. St. Aubyn
 1893-1899: Arthur John Lewis Gordon 
 1899-1926: Arthur French Sladen 
 1926-1927: Richard Osborne
 1927–1931: Sir Eric Miéville 
 1931–1935: Sir Alan Lascelles 
 1935–1946: Sir Arthur Shuldham Redfern 
 1946–1952: Harry Letson 
 1952–1959: Lionel Massey
 1959–1985: Esmond Unwin Butler 
 1985–1990: Léopold Henri Amyot 
 1990–2000: Judith A. LaRocque 
 2000–2006: Barbara Uteck 
 2006–2011: Sheila-Marie Cook 
 2011–2018: Stephen Wallace 
 2018–2021: Assunta Di Lorenzo
 2021–present: Ian McCowan

See also
 Canadian Secretary to the Queen
 Official Secretary to the Governor-General of Australia
 Official Secretary to the Governor-General of New Zealand

References

Further reading

External links
 Official website

Government of Canada